Noemi Press is an independent, nonprofit, 501(c)(3) publisher. Noemi Press was founded in 2002 to publish and promote the work of emerging and established writers, with a special emphasis on writers traditionally underrepresented by larger publishers, including women, people of color, and LGBTQIAP writers.

Noemi publishes about 8 books a year, including the Noemi Press Awards in Fiction and Poetry. They also collaborate with Letras Latinas to produce the Akrilica series.

History 
Publisher and editor-in-chief Carmen Gimenez Smith and founding editor Evan Lavender-Smith began Noemi Press in 2002 by publishing a single chapbook. It has since grown to include full-length nonfiction, critical work, drama, and fiction. Noemi Press has been housed in Las Cruces, New Mexico previously and Blacksburg, Virginia currently.

Noemi Press Awards in Poetry and Fiction 
Two prizes of $1,000 each and publication by Noemi Press are given annually for one book-length poetry collection and one book-length work of prose. The editors judge. Poets and Prose writers at any stage in their career may enter. The contest results are announced in the summer.

Past winners include: Lillian-Yvonne Bertram, Stephanie Sauer, Jessica Rae Bergamino, Kate Colby, Natalie Eilbert, Sara Veglahn, Muriel Leung, Yanara Friedland, Nate Liederbach, Ruth Ellen Kocher, and Caren Beilin.

AKRILICA Series 
AKRLILICA is a co-publishing venture with Letras Latinas which seeks to showcase new innovative Latinx writing. The name of the series alludes to the groundbreaking, bilingual poetry book by distinguished Chicanx writer and former United States Poet Laureate, Juan Felipe Herrera. Authors included in the AKRILICA series include Manuel Paul López, Vanessa Angélica Villarreal, Jennif(f)er Tamayo, Carolina Ebeid, Chloe Garcia Roberts, Roberto Harrison, elena minor, and Sandy Florian

Infidel Poetics Series 
The Infidel Poetics Series is a venue for shorter critical works addressing the overlap between poetry and politics, often interrogating notions of identity. The Infidel Poetics Series is named after poet-scholar Daniel Tiffany's 2009 essay collection Infidel Poetics. Infidel authors include: Lost Privilege Company, Douglas Kearney, and Sarah Vap.

References

External links 
Official website

Publishing companies established in 2002
Small press publishing companies
Non-profit publishers